Ronald Dyce Sadler Jack, PhD, D.Litt., FRSE (3 April 1941, in Ayr – 14 December 2016, in Edinburgh) was a scholar of Scottish literature and medieval literature and professor at the University of Edinburgh.

Education 
Jack studies at Ayr Academy and then at Glasgow University (1959-1964) where he achieved First Class Honours in English Language and Literature. He completed his PhD at the University of Edinburgh (1964-1968) under Professor Jack MacQueen on the topic "The Scottish Sonnet and Renaissance Poetry".

Academic Career at the University of Edinburgh 

 Assistant Lecturer: 1965
 Lecturer: 1968
 Reader: 1978
 Personal Chair, Scottish and Medieval Literature: 1987-2004
 Professor Emeritus/Honorary Fellow: 2004
 Honorary Research Fellow: 2007

Awards 

 University of Glasgow: D.Litt.,1990
 Fellow of the Royal Society of Edinburgh, 2000

Research 
His academic work focused on medieval and renaissance Scottish literature, Scottish literature in translation, Italian influences in Scottish literature and culture, Robert Burns, J. M. Barrie, Alexander Montgomerie, and other subjects.

Works 

 Robert Maclellan's Jamie the Saxt (Calder and Boyars, 1972), edited, with Ian Campbell
 The Italian Influence on Scottish Literature (Edinburgh University Press, 1972)
 Scottish Prose 1550-1700 (Calder and Boyars, 1972)
 A Choice of Scottish Verse 1560-1660 (Hodder and Stoughton, 1978) 
 The Art of Robert Burns (1982), edited, with Andrew Noble
 Sir Thomas Urquhart, "The Jewel" (Scottish Academic Press, 1984), with R. J. Lyall
 Alexander Montgomerie (Scottish Writers Series: Scottish Academic Press, 1985)
 Scotland's Literary Debt to Italy (Edinburgh University Press/ Instituto Italiano di Cultura, 1986)
 Leopardi: A Scottis Quair (Edinburgh University Press, 1987), with M. L. McLaughlin and Christopher Whyte
 The History of Scottish Literature, Volume 1, Origins to 1660 (Aberdeen University Press, 1988), edited
 Patterns of Divine Comedy in Medieval Drama (Boydell and Brewer,1989)
 The Road to the Never Land: A Re-assessment of J.M. Barrie's Dramatic Art  (Aberdeen University Press, March 1991)
 The Poetry of William Dunbar (Glasgow, 1996), as part of the Scotnotes series published by Association for Scottish Literary Studies
 J. M. Barrie: Myths and the Mythmaker (Rodopi, 2010)

Jack Medal 
In 2018, the International Association for the Study of Scottish Literatures launched the Jack Medal, named in Jack's honour. The medal is awarded every year for the best newly published academic article on a subject dealing with Scottish literature and related to reception and/or diaspora.

Jack Medal Awardees

 2018: Nikki Hessell, Stephen Clothier
 2019: Céline Sabiron
 2020: Anna Fancett
 2021: Bryony Coombs

References 

1941 births
2016 deaths
People from Ayr
Alumni of the University of Glasgow
Alumni of the University of Edinburgh
Academics of the University of Edinburgh
Literary scholars